The Race Rocks Tidal Power Demonstration Project (official name: Pearson College - EnCana - Clean Current Tidal Power Demonstration Project at Race Rocks) was a joint project of the Lester B. Pearson College, EnCana Corporation and Clean Current Power Systems Incorporated to use tidal power at Race Rocks near Victoria, British Columbia in Canada. The Race Rocks Tidal Current Generator was installed from July to September 2006 and it was planned to replace two diesel generators at Race Rocks Ecological Reserve. It was the first in-stream tidal current generator in North America.

The water lubricated bearing system did not perform as expected, and the prototype was decommissioned in May 2007, so that the bearing system could be redesigned.
After changes to the bearings, shroud and turbine, Clean Current Power Systems reinstalled the unit on October 17, 2008. On September 17, 2011, the project ended when the turbine/generator was removed permanently.

References

External links

 Home page of racerocks.com website
The Integrated Energy System powering Race Rocks

Energy infrastructure completed in 2006
Tidal power stations in British Columbia
2006 establishments in British Columbia
2011 disestablishments in British Columbia